Looney Tunes Cartoons is an American animated television series developed by Peter Browngardt and produced by Warner Bros. Animation, based on the characters from Looney Tunes and Merrie Melodies. The series made its worldwide debut at the Annecy International Animated Film Festival on June 10, 2019, and premiered on HBO Max on May 27, 2020.

Production

In 2017, after Browngardt finished Uncle Grandpa, he met with Audrey Diehl, the creative executive at Warner Bros., at a lunch meeting. They discussed a project in which he was not interested, and as they wrapped up lunch, Pete said, "You know, what I really want to do is to direct a Looney Tunes short". She was surprised that he was a fan of Looney Tunes and booked him a meeting with studio president, Sam Register. Browngardt expressed that he wanted to direct it in the spirit of the classic 1940s cartoons. He then began casting, hiring Eric Bauza, and as an admirer of Jim Soper's art on Instagram, hired him as a character designer.

Warner Bros. Animation announced a new series in June 2018, to "consist of 1,000 minutes spread across 1–6 minute shorts each season", be released in 2019 and featuring "the brand's marquee characters voiced by their current voice actors in simple gag-driven and visually vibrant stories". The style of the series is reminiscent of the classic Looney Tunes shorts made by Tex Avery, Bob Clampett, Chuck Jones, Friz Freleng, Robert McKimson and others. Register and Browngardt serve as executive producers for the series. The characters are designed by Jim Soper, with the model sheets copyright dating back to 2018. The initial designs for Looney Tunes Cartoons were previewed in the Warner Bros. Animation logo that was first shown before Teen Titans Go! To the Movies. The animation was directed by Joey Capps, who also did animation work on Adult Swim's Superjail!.

The series brings all of the Looney Tunes together under one roof, having already reintroduced Bugs Bunny, Daffy Duck, Tweety, Sylvester, Porky Pig, The Gremlin, Elmer Fudd, The Gashouse Gorillas, Yosemite Sam, Granny, Doctor Quack, Beaky Buzzard, Mama Buzzard, Road Runner, Wile E. Coyote, Cecil Turtle, Sam Sheepdog, Ralph Wolf, the Fly, Cicero Pig, Taz, Gossamer, Dr. Frankenbeans, Witch Hazel, Petunia Pig, the French Horse, Rocky, Mugsy, Clancy Cop, the Russian Dog, the Rich Lady, Foghorn Leghorn, Barnyard Dawg, The Weasel, Hector the Bulldog, Marvin the Martian, the Dead End Kid, the Judge, Pete Puma, Hubie, Bertie, Claude Cat, Fred Sheepdog, George Wolf, Gruesome Gorilla, Mrs. Gruesome Gorilla, Charlie Dog, and the Instant Martians as more original characters have been confirmed to appear along the way.

The animation for the series was outsourced to different studios, including Yowza! Animation, Yearim Productions, Snipple Animation and Tonic DNA. A trailer for the series was released on April 21, 2020. The short Pest Coaster was released on May 5 on the WB Kids YouTube channel as a sneak preview ahead of the release date.

Producers included copious amounts of cartoon violence and Acme Corporation weaponry, but excluded any depictions of firearms in the first season; Elmer Fudd, for example, used different non-firearm weapons (e.i. a scythe or an axe) to hunt Bugs Bunny instead of his shotgun. With the release of Space Jam: A New Legacy, the restriction was removed.

Browngardt confirmed production had resumed on more episodes in 2020. Five new segments were released under the umbrella title Bugs Bunny's 24-Carrot Holiday Special on December 3, 2020.

Jim Soper stated in May 2021 that the series had wrapped up its first 1000 minutes worth of content, with the remaining episodes to be released on HBO Max at later dates. On July 9, 2022, Warner Bros. Discovery announced that there will be a Looney Tunes themed panel at San Diego Comic-Con called Looney Tunes for Everyone, which had the crew from Looney Tunes Cartoons and the two upcoming shows, including supervising producer Alex Kirwan and voice actor Eric Bauza. The panel commenced at 10 am  on July 22.

On July 22, 2022, it was announced that a Halloween special titled Bugs Bunny’s Howl-O-Skreem Spooktacula and a new season will be released. The special was released on September 29, 2022.

On November 22, 2022, Browngardt announced that the production was finally finished, with 209 shorts produced. More episodes were confirmed to release in 2023.

Voice cast

 Eric Bauza as Bugs Bunny, Daffy Duck, Porky Pig (The Day the Earth Blew Up), Tweety, Pepé Le Pew, Barnyard Dawg, Marvin the Martian, Claude Cat,  Charlie Dog, Henery Hawk, The Weasel, The Do-Do, Doctor Quack, and The French Horse
 Bob Bergen as Porky Pig, Cicero Pig, The Gremlin, and The Dead End Kid
 Jeff Bergman as Sylvester, Elmer Fudd, Foghorn Leghorn, and Ralph Wolf
 Paul Julian as Road Runner (archival recording)
 Fred Tatasciore as Yosemite Sam, Taz, Gossamer, Sam Sheepdog, Mugsy, Gruesome Gorilla, Mrs. Gruesome Gorilla, The Judge, The Mummy, and The Grim Reaper
 Candi Milo as Granny and Witch Hazel
 Michael Ruocco as Beaky Buzzard
 Keith Ferguson as Cecil Turtle 
 Lara Jill Miller as Petunia Pig
 Stephen Stanton as Pete Puma
 Sean Kenin as Hubie and Bertie
 James Adomian as Rocky
 Kevin Michael Richardson as The Gashouse Gorillas 
 Rachel Butera as Mama Buzzard
 Carlos Alazraqui as Clancy Cop and The Leprechaun
 Tom Kenny as Mad Scientist and Alabaster "Kookoo" Kirwan
 James Arnold Taylor as Russian Dog
 Kari Wahlgren as Rich Lady, Bear
 Steve Blum as Goon and Proctor
 Corey Burton as Norm Macabre
 Roger Craig Smith as Dunk Ellington
 John DiMaggio as Pilgrim
 Jennifer Hale as Additional Voices

Several archival recordings of Paul Julian as Road Runner and Mel Blanc are used for numerous characters, such as the tiny Daffys in "Bubble Dum". Wile E. Coyote appears, but does not talk. Other characters that are confirmed to appear are Marc Antony and Pussyfoot, The Three Bears, and Ralph Phillips.

Shorts

Home media
Ten episodes of the show (all centering around Bugs) were released as bonus features for the Bugs Bunny 80th Anniversary Collection Blu-ray set on December 1, 2020. The first three seasons became available to iTunes on August 29, 2021.

Release 
Following its Annecy premiere, the series' first 10 episodes was released on HBO Max on May 27, 2020, with the next 20 episodes releasing through April 29, 2021. The series also premiered on Cartoon Network on July 5, 2021, to promote Space Jam: A New Legacy. On April Fools Day, ACME Night aired a marathon of selected shorts with segments of Bugs Bunny pulling pranks on illusionist Kevin Parry.

International broadcast 
In Canada, the series premiered on Teletoon on October 11, 2020. In Australia and New Zealand, the series premiered on Cartoon Network on April 23, 2021. In the United Kingdom and Ireland, the series premiered on Boomerang on June 7, 2021. In Japan, the series premiered on Cartoon Network on August 15, 2021.

Reception
The first ten shorts debuted at Annecy International Animated Film Festival in June 2019 and were met with very positive reactions, being described as true to the spirit of the original Looney Tunes shorts. Film reviewing site Oneofus.net noted: "While only time will tell if these shorts will become classics, they decidedly will be seen as a noble attempt to bring the "Looney" back into Looney Tunes. The cartoons are manic, beautifully animated, and feature amazing voice acting. Even the music tries to recapture the spirit of the originals. Even the characters are doing like what they did in old 30s and 40s shorts".

The official launch of the first ten episodes with HBO Max was also met with positive reviews. Review aggregator Rotten Tomatoes reported an approval rating of 88% based on 25 reviews, with an average rating of 8.00/10. The critics' consensus reads: "A vibrantly goofy return to form, Looney Tunes Cartoons is perfectly calibrated cartoon comedy". Metacritic gave the series a weighted score of 71 out of 100 based on 11 reviews, indicating "generally favorable reviews".

Accolades

Feature film
A television film based on the series named "The Day the Earth Blew Up" is currently in development and is set to be written by [[Tom & Jerry (2021 film)|Tom & Jerry'''s 2021 movie]] writer Kevin Costello, centering on Daffy Duck and Porky Pig trying to stop an alien invasion. The film is set to air on Cartoon Network's ACME Night'' programming block. It was set to be released on HBO Max, however, on August 22, 2022, it was announced the film will not be moving forward on HBO Max and will be shopped elsewhere. A one-minute clip of the movie was released on September 22, 2022, to be shown later at the Ottawa International Animation Festival.

References

External links

 
 Looney Tunes Cartoons on HBO Max

2020s American animated television series
2020s American children's comedy television series
2020s American surreal comedy television series
2020 American television series debuts
American children's animated comedy television series
Animated television series reboots
Slapstick comedy
Television shows adapted into films
Looney Tunes television series
Bugs Bunny
Wile E. Coyote and the Road Runner
English-language television shows
HBO Max original programming
Cartoon Network original programming
Animated television series about rabbits and hares
Animated television series about ducks
Animated television series about pigs
Animated television series about cats
Animated television series about birds
Television shows set in the United States
Television series impacted by the COVID-19 pandemic
Television series created by Peter Browngardt
Television series by Warner Bros. Animation
Annie Award winners
Children's and Family Emmy Award winners